The Taupō Rift is the seismically active rift valley containing the Taupō Volcanic Zone, central North Island of New Zealand.

Geology
The Taupō Rift (Taupo Rift) is a  intra-arc continental rift resulting from an oblique convergence in the Hikurangi subduction zone. Consensus does not yet exist with regard to the cause of the Taupō Rift's extension or the exceptional volcanic productivity of the associated Taupō Volcanic Zone. Its geology and landforms are of worldwide interest and it contains multiple significant faults and volcanoes with some of the volcanoes having potential for worldwide impact.

Volcanic context
The recent volcanism of the Taupō Volcanic Zone has been divided into three segments with a central rhyolitic segment dominated by explosive caldera associated with more typical Island Arc type andesite-dacite stratovolcanoes in either surrounding segment. There are hundreds of faults and their segments, with some having potential association with volcanism, but most being tectonic.

Tectonic context
The rate of spread of the rift varies from effectively zero at its southern inland end where the South Wanganui Basin is forming an initial back-arc basin, and volcanic activity has not yet begun to in the Bay of Plenty as much as /yr. The majority of the fault activity is normal faulting. While continental intraarc rifts such as this and those associated with Mount Aso in Japan, and the Trans-Mexican Volcanic Belt result from a different tectonic process from the more studied intracontinental (intraplate) rifts it has been shown that the Taupō Rift displays all of the three modes of evolution, being narrowing, lateral migration, and along-strike propagation, found with intracontinental rifts. The Taupo Rift is widening much faster that other continental intraarc rifts which might drive this evolution during a relatively short geological timeframe. While in the Bay of Plenty region the current active faults of the old Taupō Rift can align with those of the modern Taupō Rift as illustrated by the Edgecumbe Fault this is not the case further south where the old Taupō Rift faults appear to be inactive. There are breaks in the intra-rift fault systems in the recently active central rhyolitic caldera segment. The normal fault trends range from N20°E in the south to N45°E in the central and northern sectors. The modern Taupō Volcanic Zone starting forming 61,000 years ago but the modern Taupō Rift appears to only have intra-rift fault activity after the immensely disruptive Oruanui eruption.

Risks
Earthquake activity in the Taupo Rift exhibits the entire spectrum of behaviour ranging from large, ground rupturing events to swarm activity comprising thousands of small events. In the time since Māori settlement these larger earthquakes can be speculated to have resulted in more indirect loss of life than volcanic activity, although as this is driven by oral tradition reports of hundreds dying in a relatively recent landslip on the Waihi Fault Zone south of Lake Taupō it may not be true. Certainly in the context that the Taupō Volcano has been responsible for the largest eruption of the last 30,000 years being the Oruanui eruption, and the more recent smaller 232 ± 10 CE Hatepe eruption but both eruptions occurred before human settlement, the relative risk of earthquakes versus volcanoes depends upon time scale considered.

See also
Taupō Volcanic Zone

References

Taupō Volcanic Zone
Rifts and grabens
Geology of New Zealand
Geologic formations of New Zealand